Saouaf is a small town located in Zaghouan Governorate in the southern part of the governorate, and about 26 km in a straight line south of the city of Zaghouan.

References 

Communes of Tunisia